Rincón Zapotec (Northern Villa Alta Zapotec, Nexitzo) is a Zapotec language of Oaxaca, Mexico.

Temaxcalapan dialect may be distinct enough to be considered a separate language. The next closest language is Choápam Zapotec, with 65% intelligibility.

Las Delicias and Yagallo have approximately 75% similarity.

Phonology

Vowels

Consonants 

Sounds such as /f k ʎ m ɲ r v w/ only occur in loanwords from Spanish. A double consonant ll occurs as a geminated /lː/ rather than a palatalized ll from Spanish.

References

Alleman, Vera Mae, compiler. 1952. Vocabulario zapoteco del Rincón. Mexico City: Instituto Lingüístico de Verano.
Earl, Robert. 1968. "Rincon Zapotec clauses." International Journal of American Linguistics 34: 269-74.
Earl, Robert. 2018. "Gramática del zapoteco de Rincón". Mexico

External links 

Zapotec languages